The 2022 IIHF World Championship Division II was an international ice hockey tournament run by the International Ice Hockey Federation.

The Group A tournament was held in Zagreb, Croatia from 25 to 30 April and the Group B tournament in Reykjavík, Iceland from 18 to 23 April 2022.

After the tournament was cancelled the two previous years due to the COVID-19 pandemic, all teams stayed put in their respective groups.

China won Group A and got promoted to Division IB, while Iceland won Group B and got promoted to Group A.

In order to fill each group of the World Championships back to their normal amount of teams, the IIHF made the decision following the tournament not to relegate Israel or Mexico, who finished last in Groups A and B respectively, but instead to promote the Netherlands and Georgia, the runners-up of each group.

Group A tournament

Participants

Match officials
Three referees and five linesmen are selected for the tournament.

Standings

Results
All times are local (UTC+2)

Statistics

Scoring leaders
List shows the top skaters sorted by points, then goals.

GP = Games played; G = Goals; A = Assists; Pts = Points; +/− = Plus/minus; PIM = Penalties in minutes; POS = Position
Source: IIHF.com

Goaltending leaders
Only the top five goaltenders, based on save percentage, who have played at least 40% of their team's minutes, are included in this list.

TOI = time on ice (minutes:seconds); SA = shots against; GA = goals against; GAA = goals against average; Sv% = save percentage; SO = shutouts
Source: IIHF.com

Awards

Group B tournament

Participants

Match officials
Three referees and five linesmen were selected for the tournament.

Standings

Results
All times are local (UTC±0)

Statistics

Scoring leaders
List shows the top skaters sorted by points, then goals.

GP = Games played; G = Goals; A = Assists; Pts = Points; +/− = Plus/minus; PIM = Penalties in minutes; POS = Position
Source: IIHF.com

Goaltending leaders
Only the top five goaltenders, based on save percentage, who have played at least 40% of their team's minutes, are included in this list.

TOI = time on ice (minutes:seconds); SA = shots against; GA = goals against; GAA = goals against average; Sv% = save percentage; SO = shutouts
Source: IIHF.com

Awards

References

External links
 Official site for Division IIA
 Official site for Division IIB

2022
Division II
2022 IIHF World Championship Division II
2022 IIHF World Championship Division II
Sports competitions in Reykjavík
2022 in Croatian sport
2022 in Icelandic sport
April 2022 sports events in Croatia
April 2022 sports events in Europe